Reaction Engines Limited is a British aerospace manufacturer based in Oxfordshire, England.

History and personnel
In , Reaction Engines was founded by Alan Bond (lead engineer on the British Interplanetary Society's Project Daedalus) and Richard Varvill and John Scott-Scott (the two principal Rolls-Royce engineers from the RB545 engine project). The company conducts research into space propulsion systems, centred on the development of the Skylon re-usable SSTO spaceplane. The three founders had worked together on the HOTOL project, funding for which had been withdrawn the previous year, in 1988.

In 2015, BAE Systems agreed to buy a 20% stake in the company for £20.6m as part of an agreement to help develop Reaction Engines' Synergetic Air-Breathing Rocket Engine (SABRE) hypersonic engine designed to propel the Skylon orbiter.

In April 2018, Boeing announced its investment in Reaction Engines, through Boeing HorizonX Ventures with a $37.3 million Series B funding alongside Rolls-Royce PLC and BAE Systems.

Current research

Skylon

Skylon is a design for a single-stage-to-orbit combined-cycle-powered orbital spaceplane.

SABRE

Skylon and the SABRE engine by which it will be powered are being developed as a private venture which aims to overcome the obstacles that were imposed on further HOTOL development due to the British government classifying the HOTOL engine as an "Official Secret," and keeping the engine design classified for many years afterward.

The company's current development effort is focused on developing a ground demonstration of the SABRE air-breathing core, with additional funding gained from the sale of consultancy and spin-off applications from its heat exchanger expertise.

In February 2009, the European Space Agency announced that it was partially funding work on Skylon's engine to produce technology demonstrations by 2011. With this funding Reaction Engines completed a non-frosting sub-zero heat exchanger demonstration program, Bristol University developed the STRICT expansion/deflection nozzle and DLR completed an oxidiser-cooled combustion chamber demonstration. Reaction claimed this work moved the Skylon project to a TRL of 4/5.

In July 2016, at the Farnborough Air Show, Reaction Engines announced £60m in funds from the UK Space Agency and ESA to create a ground-based SABRE demonstration engine by 2020.

Commenting on work undertaken at TF2 in Colorado, in April 2019, Reaction Engines announced that it has successfully tested the precooler technology for supersonic conditions needed to prevent the engine from melting, and in October 2019, Reaction announced that it successfully validated its precooler for hypersonic (Mach 5) conditions.

United States

In January 2014, Reaction entered into a Cooperative research and development agreement (CRADA) with the United States Air Force Research Laboratory (AFRL) to assess and develop SABRE technology.

In 2015 AFRL announced their analysis "confirmed the feasibility and potential performance of the SABRE engine cycle". however they felt SSTO as a first application was a very high risk development path and proposed that a Two Stage to Orbit (TSTO) vehicle was a more realistic first step.

In March 2017, Reaction announced the formation of an American subsidiary, Reaction Engines Inc (REI), led by Adam Dissel in Castle Rock, Colorado.

In September 2017, REI announced a contract from DARPA to test a Reaction precooler test article "HTX" at temperatures exceeding , previous precooler tests focusing on frost control having been conducted from ambient temperature.

Other studies

LAPCAT A2

On 5 February 2008 the company announced it had designed a passenger plane to the concept stage. The LAPCAT A2 would be capable of flying, non-stop, halfway around the world at hypersonic speed (Mach 5+).

The engine, SCIMITAR, has precooler technology which is somewhat similar to SABRE, but does not have the rocket features, and is optimized for higher efficiency for atmospheric flight.

Passenger Module for Skylon
Although Skylon is designed to only launch and retrieve satellites, and would be unmanned, Reaction Engines Ltd. has proposed a passenger module in the payload bay of the Reaction Engines Skylon spaceplane.

The passenger module is sized to fit in the payload bay, and early designs could carry up to 24 passengers and 1 crew. There is an ISS-type docking port and airlock as the central feature. There are two ground entry doors that align with the doors on the side of the Skylon payload bay to allow easy ground access to the cabin. The doors are fitted with conventional inflatable chutes for passengers to escape in case of any ground emergency. There could be Space Shuttle-type windows on the roof of the module for passengers to enjoy the view in space. There is also a washroom and hygienic facilities provided in the cabin.

Further studies refined the concept, with an initial configuration to be fitted with five ejector seats, for four passengers and one crew, rather similar to the first four Space Shuttle spaceflights. Once the passenger module is fully certified, the ejection seats will be removed and there will be 16 upright seats installed for a short stay in space (<14 days) and 4 supine seats for long stay in space (>14 days). An upright seat will also be provided for the crew. There are also life support systems under the cabin floor, equipment bays, and cargo holds.

Orbital Base Station
The Orbital Base Station (OBS) is a concept of a future, expandable space station to serve as an integral part of a future space transportation system and also in the maintenance and construction of future manned Moon and Mars spacecraft.

The construction of the OBS is modular, and assumes the use of the Reaction Engines Skylon in Low Earth Orbit. The structure is based on a cylinder, designed to allow space inside the cylindrical section for the construction and repair of various spacecraft. The cylindrical structure will also provide space for habitation modules with docking ports, manipulator arms, and propellant farms to refuel an interplanetary spacecraft.

Reaction Engines Project Troy
The Reaction Engines Troy Mission is a concept of a future crewed mission to Mars. The concept arose to confirm the capability of the Skylon launch vehicle that it can and does enable large human exploration to the Solar System's planets.

The Troy spacecraft concept consists of an robotic precursor mission, including an Earth Departure Stage, and a Mars Transfer Stage. There is a habitation module, a storage module, and a propulsion module to be deployed from the spacecraft to land together at a selected site on the Martian surface to form a base. There are also ferry vehicles that would transfer crew members to and from the base to an orbiting crewed spacecraft. There would be three precursor spacecraft to Mars to set up three bases on the planet to enable maximum exploration of the planet's surface.

50 days after launch, the Earth Departure Stage is brought back to low Earth orbit by the Earth's gravity, and the Fluyt space tug would bring the stage back to the Orbital Base Station for construction of the later crewed mission.

The crewed spacecraft would consist of 3 habitation modules, 3 docking ports, and two ferry vehicles. The spacecraft would rotate along the centerline to provide artificial gravity. It would leave Earth with the Earth Departure Stage and transfer to Mars with the Mars Transfer Stage, and rendezvous with the precursor spacecraft in Martian orbit. The craft would dock together to enable the crew to transfer to the ferry vehicles for descent to the surface at a selected site. The crew, along with the equipped rovers, would spend 14 months to explore the Martian surface. The crew would return to Martian orbit with the ferry vehicle and rendezvous and dock with the orbiting crewed spacecraft. After a detailed inspection of the vehicle, the spacecraft would leave Mars for Earth on the Earth Return Stage. When the craft is captured in a Molniya orbit around Earth, the crew would board a ferry vehicle for transfer to low Earth orbit and rendezvous and dock with the waiting Skylon spacecraft for return to Earth.

Construction of the spacecraft would take place at the Orbital Base Station inside the cylindrical structure. Because the spacecraft is of highly modular design, the components would be brought up by the Skylon spacecraft. The rocket engines, fuel and oxidizer tanks, and habitation modules are sized to fit inside the Skylon payload bay, and that the fully assembled craft would also fit inside the cylindrical structure of the OBS.

Fluyt OTV
 
The Fluyt Orbital Transfer Vehicle is a concept of a future space tug. It would have the ability to dock with orbiting spacecraft and move payload in orbit. It is conceived to be assembled from two parts, each sized to fit inside the Skylon payload bay, it would be launched from the Skylon and would also be an integral part for the construction of the Orbital Base Station as well as the Reaction Engines Troy and the retrieval of the Earth Departure Stage from the Precursor mission of the Troy mission.

References

Publications

External links
 Reaction Engines Limited homepage
 Reaction Engines Talk to the Space Fellowship
 Mark Hempsell from Reaction Engines appeared on The Space Show
 
 

1989 establishments in the United Kingdom
Aerospace companies of the United Kingdom
Companies based in Oxfordshire
Manufacturing companies established in 1989
Rocket engine manufacturers of the United Kingdom
Science and technology in Oxfordshire
South Oxfordshire District
Space programme of the United Kingdom
Private spaceflight companies